Early College High School (ECHS) is an early college senior high school on the grounds of Brookhaven College, in Farmers Branch, Texas, in the Dallas-Fort Worth Metroplex.  Timothy A. Isaly is the principal.

ECHS, the fifth CFBISD high school, opened in 2006. It takes in about 75-100 9th grade students on an annual basis.

In 2014 it was named a National Blue Ribbon School.

References

External links
 

Carrollton-Farmers Branch Independent School District high schools
2006 establishments in Texas
Educational institutions established in 2006
University-affiliated schools in the United States
Early College High Schools